Roy Clements (born 1946 in London) is a British author and former Christian minister. He was a leading figure within Britain's Evangelical Christian movement for more than two decades until in 1999 he left his wife, resigned from his pastoral ministry and revealed that he is gay.

Biography
Roy Clements grew up in the East End of London and earned a PhD in Chemical Physics, before working for the University Colleges Christian Fellowship in Nairobi and serving as pastor of Nairobi Baptist Church in Kenya.
He returned to the UK in 1979 when he became pastor of Eden Baptist Church, Cambridge, where he developed a highly successful ministry to students.
Over a period of some twenty years, he gained a reputation within the international Christian movement as an accomplished preacher and teacher. Until 1999 he served on the boards of a number of leading evangelical organisations, including the management council of the Evangelical Alliance, which represents more than a million British Christians across 30 denominations. His ministry within British evangelicalism ended in 1999 when he resigned from his church ministry and left his wife and four children, and began a relationship with another man.

List of works
Theology books and biblical commentaries

 A Sting in the Tale (IVP), expositions from the parables of Luke
 Practising Faith in a Pagan World (IVP), expositions from Daniel/Ezekiel
 Masterplan (IVP)
 No Longer Slaves (IVP), expositions from Galatians
 Turning the World Upside Down (IVP), expositions from Acts 1–15
 People Who Made History (IVP), expositions from Judges/Ruth
 Songs of Experience (Focus/Baker), expositions from selected Psalms
 The Strength of Weakness (Focus/Baker), expositions from II Corinthians
 Introducing Jesus (Kingsway), expositions from the Gospel of John
 From Head to Heart (Kingsway), expositions from the First Letter of John
 Word and Spirit (UCCF), an examination of the Bible and the charismatic gift of prophecy
 Turning Points (UCCF), an overview of cultural trends
 Why I Believe (Regent College Publishing)
 Rescue: God's Promise to Save (Focus), with Peter Lewis and Greg Haslam, a short exploration of the five points of Calvinism

Jubilee Centre papers

Clements published a number of papers with Cambridge Papers, a non-profit quarterly publication of the Jubilee Centre, a Cambridge-based centre for contemporary theological reflection which he helped to found. These papers include:  "Can Tolerance become the Enemy of Christian Freedom?" (an examination of pluralism in two papers); "Officiously to Keep Alive" (a two-part examination of euthanasia); "Demons and the Mind" (a two-part study of mental illness in the Bible); and "Expository Preaching in a Postmodern World".

Notes

Other references
  Roy Clements Archive on the Courage.org.uk website
  (NB may work intermittently)
  Clements's correspondence with Dr John Stott about his theological analysis of homosexuality
  Evangelicals Concerned report of Clements's outing

External links
 Official Roy Clements Sermon Archive
  Recent sermons by Clements
  Eden Baptist Church, Cambridge
  Evangelical Alliance UK
  Nairobi Baptist Church

See also
 Homosexuality and Christianity

LGBT Protestant clergy
Living people
1946 births
Writers from London